"(Shake That) Cosmic Thing" (also known only as "Cosmic Thing") is a song by The B-52's released as a single on the soundtrack to the film Earth Girls Are Easy. It was also released as the first single from their album Cosmic Thing, although it was airplay only.

The music video for the song is live footage from an August 17, 1990, concert live from the Shoreline Amphitheatre, in Mountain View, California.

Chart positions

1989 singles
The B-52's songs
Song recordings produced by Don Was
Songs written by Fred Schneider
Songs written by Kate Pierson
Songs written by Keith Strickland
Songs written by Cindy Wilson
Song recordings produced by Nile Rodgers
Warner Records singles
1988 songs